Events from the year 1740 in Canada.

Incumbents
French Monarch: Louis XV
British and Irish Monarch: George II

Governors
Governor General of New France: Charles de la Boische, Marquis de Beauharnois
Colonial Governor of Louisiana: Jean-Baptiste Le Moyne de Bienville
Governor of Nova Scotia: Paul Mascarene
Commodore-Governor of Newfoundland: Henry Medley

Events
 1740s: The Mandan Indians west of the Great Lakes begin to trade in horses descended from those brought to Texas by the Spanish. Itinerant Assiniboine Indians bring them from Mandan settlements to their own territories southwest of Lake Winnipeg.
 1740-1748: The War of the Austrian Succession, with the American counterpart King George's War.

Births

Deaths
 August 20 : François-Louis de Pourroy de Lauberivière, bishop of Quebec (b. 1711).

Historical documents
Description of making and using Mi'kmaw canoes, both moosehide (in past) and birchbark currently used

Woman in Montreal who needs money sells enslaved 20-year-old Pawnee named Manon for 300 livres "in receipts from the Beaver trade"

In spring and summer, Joseph La France canoes Rainy Lake and Lake of the Woods, meeting Monsoni Ojibwe and "Sturgeon Indians"

Suffering from gout, Jesuit ministers to Indigenous people, parish of 400 and distant members of his flock near Montreal (Note: "savages" used)

Council president Paul Mascarene "notifies the Indians and inhabitants" of Nova Scotia that King has declared war on King of Spain

To preserve "Indulgence they have heitherto Enjoyed," Acadians are reminded to conform to government orders and decisions

Mascarene letter (summary) ends with warning to Acadians to be loyal or face reaction that "will involve the innocent with the guilty"

Acadian deputies to handle "restless spirits" so that "community may not make itself suspected, and avoid the ruin which may overtake it"

Mascarene specifies some civil service roles, and is concerned that in "these thirty years past," Protestants have not peopled Nova Scotia

Handling Acadians' need for new land when it is allowed only to Protestants means letting them take land anyway or expelling them

Fearing unauthorized priest will direct when "a stroke" is to be given their government, Council decides his community must expel him

Priests forbidden to excommunicate "Whereby to Deprive His Majesty's Subjects[...]of Assistance or means To Procure their Livelyhood"

Mascarene advises missionary priest of King's supremacy over both Catholic Church and his conduct in Nova Scotia

Mascarene reports that some shippers into and out of Nova Scotia are not clearing with port authorities

"Succeeded far above our Expectations" - "Indian trade" at Oswego has undercut prices at Montreal by half and increased trade fivefold

"Be always on your Guard" - Hudson's Bay Company urges Bay staff to be prepared for (probably unlikely) attack by Spanish

Given war with Spain and perhaps France, chief factor at Prince of Wales Fort cancels next year's northern expedition in order to augment defences

References

 
Canada
40